Le Noise is the 30th studio album by Canadian / American musician Neil Young, released on September 28, 2010. The album was recorded in Los Angeles and produced by Daniel Lanois, hence the titular pun.

Recording
Young initially called Daniel Lanois in early 2010 with the request to make an acoustic album, after seeing videos on the internet of Lanois and engineer Mark Howard working on Black Dub. The recording took place at a makeshift studio set up at Lanois's Silverlake house. While attempting to record "Hitchhiker", a song written back in the 1970s and finished during the sessions, Young decided that it felt more appropriate to play on an electric guitar. While two songs, "Love and War" and "Peaceful Valley Boulevard", remained in acoustic form, Young did the rest of the album on electric guitar, with Howard and Lanois applying dub techniques they had developed while working on Black Dub. A distinctive guitar sound was achieved by Young playing a Gretsch White Falcon with stereo pickups through two Fender Deluxe amplifiers, and treated with Eventide H3500 subharmonic generator. Both guitar and voice were treated with delay effects from the Lexicon Prime Time and the TC Electronics Fireworks; Lanois and Howard applied the effects in real time, with Young able to hear the results through the monitoring system. According to Howard, "when you stood in the centre of the room, it was the best sound you've ever heard, it was incredible. We had those speakers going at full tilt, and when you put your hand on the walls, they were shaking. It was almost earthquake material! [...] Neil was pushing us, saying, 'Hey guys, that's great, just take it to the next level. Give me more of that!' So after recording, we went in there again with most songs and caught certain words and phrases and dubbed them".

The original version of "Hitchhiker", recorded in 1976, would be released in 2017 on an archival album of the same name.

Release
On August 20, Young revealed the upcoming album and its release date stating that it would be a solo album. Le Noise was released on September 28 on CD, vinyl, Blu-ray and digitally. Accompanying the album was a black and white film of live-in-studio performances of all the songs, shot by Adam CK Vollick; it was released on YouTube as well as in DVD format. Videos for "Angry World", "Hitchhiker", "Love And War" and "Walk With Me" were premiered separately before the album release.

The track "Angry World" won a Grammy Award for Best Solo Rock Vocal Performance.

Outtakes
A number of songs recorded during the sessions didn't make it to the final album; these recordings were premiered in August 2019 as a part of The Complete Le Noise Sessions film which was available for streaming for 24 hours on Neil Young Archives website. "Born in Ontario", "Twisted Road" and "For the Love of Man" would be later re-recorded with Crazy Horse for Psychedelic Pill, while "You Never Call" (a tribute to recently deceased L.A. Johnson, a longtime associate of Young) was frequently performed live during the tour in support of the album and appears on concert film Neil Young Journeys.

Critical reception
Le Noise received generally positive reviews with Uncut magazine proclaiming it as the second best album of 2010 in its year-end Top 50 Albums list.  This album was number 20 on Rolling Stones list of the 30 Best Albums of 2010.

The album was named as a longlisted nominee for the 2011 Polaris Music Prize.

Commercial performance
The album was placed 2nd on the Canadian Albums Chart, selling over 10,000 copies in the first week of release.

Track listing

Personnel
Neil Young - guitars, vocals

Audio production
Produced by: Daniel Lanois
Recorded by: Mark Howard Recorded and mixed at: Le Noise
Digital Editing by: Pretty Tony Mangurian & Florian Flo Ammon
Mastered by: Chris Bellman for Bernie Grundman Mastering
Crew: Mark Humphreys, Ian Galloway, Eric Johnson
Production Assistant to Daniel Lanois and Hospitality: Margaret Marissen

Visual production
Directed by: Adam CK Vollick & Daniel Lanois, with Mark Howard
Produced by: Daniel Lanois & Bernard Shakey
Director of Photography and Editing: Adam C.K. Vollick
Filmed at: Le Noise
Angry World additional footage courtesy of NASA
Angry World dancer: Carolina Cerisola

Blu-ray production
Directed by: Bernard Shakey
Produced by: Will Mitchell
Executive Producer: Elliot Rabinowitz
Blu-ray design, authoring, programming & Post Production at MX, San Francisco, CA
Art Direction for MX: Toshi Onuki
Producers for MX: Ole Lütjens, Joe Rice & Tony Rotundo
Engineering and QC for MX: Richard Ross, Phil Starner, Travis Boyle & David Bourn
Production Assistance: Brandon LaSan, Eric Martinez & Mario San Miguel
Additional Post Production at Upstream Multimedia
Additional production Assistance: Hannah Johnson
All photos by Adam C.K. Vollick  Except theater marquee photo, courtesy of Jim Misiano

Charts

References

External links
 Neil Young, 'Walk With Me' -- Video Premiere
 

2010 albums
Neil Young albums
Reprise Records albums
Albums produced by Daniel Lanois
Garage rock albums by Canadian artists
Experimental rock albums by Canadian artists
Juno Award for Adult Alternative Album of the Year albums